South Africa 'A', also formerly known as the Junior Springboks or the Emerging Springboks, are the second national rugby union team representing South Africa, below the senior national team, the Springboks. Until 2018, it was also under the South Africa Under-20 team in the country's rugby hierarchy, but World Rugby changed its regulations to prohibit unions from designating an under-20 team as its second 15-a-side team.

They competed in the Nations Cup in 2007 and 2008 alongside the full national teams of Namibia, Romania and Georgia as well as Argentina Jaguars and Italy A. They also sporadically play touring sides such as the British and Irish Lions.

The team is made up of players of all ages and is not a youth side. The selection criteria vary, and it has been used most recently to give potential Springboks a taste of international rugby or to give experienced Springboks playing time to improve fitness or form.

Current squad

South Africa A squad to face the British & Irish Lions as part of the 2021 tour and the Bulls as a warm-up match.

See also
 South African Barbarians
 South Africa President's XV

References

South Africa national rugby union team
Second national rugby union teams